John Cotton may refer to:

Politicians
 John Cotton (fl. 1379–88), MP for Cambridge 1379–1388
 John Cotton (MP died 1593) (1513–1593), MP for Cambridgeshire 1553, 1554
 John Cotton (MP died 1620/21) (1543–1620/21), MP for Cambridgeshire 1593
 Sir John Cotton, 2nd Baronet, MP for Cambridge 1689–90, 1696, 1705
 John Cotton (1671–1736), MP for Westminster 1722
 Sir John Hynde Cotton, 3rd Baronet (1686–1752), English Jacobite MP for Cambridge 1708–22,1727–41, for Cambridgeshire 1722–27, and for Marlborough 1741–52
 Sir John Cotton, 3rd Baronet, of Connington (1621–1702), MP for Huntingdon 1661 and Huntingdonshire 1685
 Sir John Hynde Cotton, 4th Baronet (c. 1717–1795), MP for St Germans 1741–47, Marlborough 1752–61, and Cambridgeshire 1764–80
 Sir John Cotton, 4th Baronet, of Connington (c. 1680–1731), MP for Huntingdon 1705 and Huntingdonshire 1710–13

Sportsmen
John Cotton (baseball) (born 1970), retired professional baseball player
John Cotton (cricketer) (born 1940), English cricketer
John Cotton (footballer) (1930–2015), footballer for Crewe Alexandra and Stoke City

Others
 Johannes Cotto or John Cotton (12th century), author of a treatise on music
 John Cotton (minister) (1585–1652), American religious leader
 John Cotton (ornithologist) (1801–1849), British and Australian artist and ornithologist
 John Cotton (author), author of a treatise on music
 John G. Cotton (born 1951), US Navy admiral
 Jack Cotton (1903–1964), British entrepreneur
 John Cotton (architect) (1844–1934), British architect to whom Frank Worthington Simon was articled

See also
Jon Cotton, record producer